Death on the Nile is a 2022 mystery film directed by Kenneth Branagh from a screenplay by Michael Green, based on the 1937 novel of the same name by Agatha Christie, and the second big screen adaptation of Christie's novel, following the 1978 film. It was produced by Branagh, Ridley Scott, Judy Hofflund and Kevin J. Walsh, as a sequel to 2017’s Murder on the Orient Express. It stars an ensemble cast with Branagh and Tom Bateman reprising their roles as Hercule Poirot and Bouc, respectively, alongside Annette Bening, Russell Brand, Ali Fazal, Dawn French, Gal Gadot, Armie Hammer, Rose Leslie, Emma Mackey, Sophie Okonedo, Jennifer Saunders and Letitia Wright.

Death on the Nile was first released in several international markets on February 9, 2022, and in the United Kingdom and the United States on February 11, 2022 following several delays due to the COVID-19 pandemic. The film received mixed reviews from critics, who perceived it as being inferior to the previous adaptations but appreciated its old-fashioned style. The film has grossed $137.3 million against a production budget of $90 million.

A sequel, titled A Haunting in Venice, an adaptation of Hallowe'en Party, is scheduled to be released on September 15, 2023, with Branagh once again directing and starring as Poirot.

Plot

In World War I, a young Hercule Poirot devises a strategy to advance his Belgian infantry company. While his strategy is initially successful, a booby trap kills and injures many in the company as well as mutilating Hercule's face. His fiancée, nurse Katherine, does not recoil, but suggests he could grow a mustache to hide his scars.

In 1937 at a London club, Poirot watches as blues singer Salome Otterbourne performs. He notices Jacqueline "Jackie" de Bellefort is there with her fiancé Simon Doyle. Jackie's childhood friend, heiress Linnet Ridgeway, soon arrives. After meeting Simon, Linnet agrees to hire him as her land agent.

Six weeks later, in Egypt, Poirot encounters his friend Bouc and Bouc's mother, Euphemia, an artist. Bouc invites Poirot to join them at the hotel to celebrate the wedding of a surprising couple – Linnet and Simon. Others join their honeymoon trip: Linnet's maid, Louise Bourget; Salome and her niece/manager, Rosalie, Linnet's schoolfriend; Linnet's godmother, Marie Van Schuyler with her nurse, Mrs. Bowers; Linnet's financial manager and cousin, Andrew Katchadourian; and Dr. Linus Windlesham, Linnet's former fiance. Linnet asks Poirot for protection from the obsessive Jackie, who has stalked the couple to Egypt; Poirot cannot dissuade Jackie, who shows him she carries a gun.

To escape Jackie, the group boards the cruise ship S.S. Karnak. Linnet tells Poirot she distrusts her guests. During an excursion to Abu Simbel, Bouc reveals he is dating Rosalie, despite his mother's disapproval; Poirot finds himself attracted to Salome. After a boulder falls off a column and nearly crushes Linnet and Simon, the guests return to the Karnak to discover Jackie has boarded. Poirot, affected by champagne, confides to Jackie that he renounced romance after Katherine died in a mortar explosion. Linnet goes to bed and Simon confronts Jackie, who shoots him in the leg. When she attempts to shoot herself, Rosalie and Bouc intervene. They take Jackie to Mrs. Bowers, while Windlesham arrives to treat Simon. The following morning, Louise discovers Linnet has been fatally shot in the head. Linnet's valuable necklace has also been stolen.

Poirot, assisted by Simon and Bouc, interrogates the guests, each of whom bears a grudge against Linnet or would benefit from her death:
 Louise's engagement was ended by Linnet, who distrusted Louise's fiancé.
 Windlesham was engaged to Linnet until she left him for Simon.
 Andrew was embezzling from Linnet.
 Bowers' formerly wealthy family was ruined by Linnet's father during the Great Depression.
 Van Schuyler is a beneficiary of Linnet's will. She and Bowers are lovers.
 Salome and Rosalie were the targets of Linnet's racist remarks, years ago.
 Euphemia finds Linnet's necklace. Poirot suspects she resented Linnet for introducing Bouc to Rosalie.
Jackie was monitored by Bowers all night. Her gun is dredged from the Nile, wrapped in Van Schuyler's missing scarf and a bloody handkerchief.

Poirot reveals that Euphemia hired him to investigate Rosalie, who, he concludes, is more than worthy of her son's affection. Rosalie, angry at being investigated, storms off and discovers Louise's body, her throat slit. Louise is found with money, so Poirot suspects that she witnessed Linnet's murder and blackmailed the killer. He sees a possible witness' outline in the blood spatter. Interrogating Bouc with Simon, Poirot deduces that Bouc found Linnet dead and stole her necklace to gain financial freedom from his mother, but panicked and put it in Euphemia's belongings. Bouc witnessed Louise's murder, but before revealing the killer, he is shot through the throat and is killed; Poirot chases the killer, but only finds the abandoned gun.

Locking the surviving guests in the boat's saloon, Poirot reveals the solution to the mystery: that Simon killed Linnet, with Jackie as his accomplice and the mastermind. They are still lovers and arranged Simon's romance with Linnet to inherit her wealth. Simon drugged Poirot's champagne and Jackie pretended to shoot Simon with a blank. Simon faked his injury with paint stolen from Euphemia. While Jackie distracted Bouc and Rosalie, Simon killed Linnet and, returning to the saloon, shot his own leg, muffled by Van Schuyler's scarf. Jackie killed Louise with Windlesham's scalpel, and Bouc with Andrew's gun. As a final clue, Poirot reveals the handkerchief that that had been used in the fake shooting, recovered along with the gun. Blood would have faded to brown in the Nile's waters, but the stains were the pale pink of faded paint. Faced with Poirot's irrefutable proof, Jackie embraces Simon and shoots him through the back, killing them both with one shot. As the passengers disembark, Poirot is unable to voice his feelings to Salome.

Six months later, Poirot visits her club to watch her rehearse, sitting alone in the dark and unrecognized by the club owner due to his clean-shaven face.

Cast

Production

Development
In 2015, Christie's great-grandson James Prichard, chairman of Agatha Christie Limited, expressed enthusiasm for sequels, citing the positive collaboration with Branagh and the production team. In May 2017, Branagh expressed interest in further installments if the first film was successful. On November 20, 2017, it was announced that 20th Century Fox was developing Death on the Nile as a sequel to their version of Murder on the Orient Express with Michael Green returning to pen the script and Kenneth Branagh set to return on camera as Poirot, and behind the camera as director.

In September 2018, Gal Gadot joined the cast. That same month, Paco Delgado was hired to design the costumes. In October 2018, Armie Hammer joined the cast, and Tom Bateman was confirmed to reprise his role as Bouc for the film. In January 2019, Jodie Comer had joined the cast. In April 2019, Letitia Wright joined the cast. Annette Bening was in talks to join in June. Russell Brand joined the cast in August 2019. Ali Fazal, Dawn French, Rose Leslie, Emma Mackey, Sophie Okonedo and Jennifer Saunders were added in September, with Comer not being involved.

Filming
Principal photography began on September 30, 2019, at Longcross Studios in Surrey, England. The film was supposed to be filmed in Morocco instead of Egypt, but filming took place only in England.

A boat was recreated, as well as the Temple of Abu Simbel. The Tiffany Yellow Diamond was used for the film. Shooting lasted until December 18, 2019.

Post-production
Úna Ní Dhonghaíle served as the editor for Death on the Nile. Double Negative (DNEG) provided the visual effects for the film, with Academy Award-winning special effects artist George Murphy as the overall visual effects supervisor. Additional VFX were provided by Lola VFX and Raynault VFX.

Music
In January 2019, Patrick Doyle, a frequent collaborator on Branagh's films (including the film's predecessor), was announced as the composer for the film.

Release

Theatrical
The film had its world premiere in France and South Korea on February 9, 2022. After having been rescheduled several times owing to the COVID-19 pandemic, Death on the Nile was theatrically released  on February 11, 2022, by 20th Century Studios. The film was originally set to be released on December 20, 2019, before being rescheduled to October 9, 2020, due to production issues. It was then pushed back two weeks to October 23, and again to December 18, in response to the domestic box office underperformance of Tenet during the COVID-19 pandemic. In November 2020, the studio removed the film, along with Free Guy, from its upcoming release schedule until further notice. The next month, the film was rescheduled to September 17, 2021. In March 2021, it was then moved to the current February 2022 date. The film was banned in Lebanon and Kuwait due to Gadot's former association with the Israel Defense Forces. The film was allowed to be released in Saudi Arabia and Tunisia. The film was released in China on February 19, 2022, making it the first Hollywood blockbuster to be released in the Chinese market after The Matrix Resurrections, which was released on January 14, 2022.

Marketing
Disney spent $18 million on television commercials promoting the film by the time it premiered in theaters. Social media analytic RelishMix said the film had a social media reach of 217.9 million interactions, "at social norms for a campaign that began 18 months ago in August 2020 and wrestled with Covid re-dates and other headline news, such as Armie Hammer." Deadline Hollywood said Disney's marketing campaign was "anchored on a socially media quiet Gadot, who was more active during Red Notice."

Home media
The film released digitally on March 29, 2022, and on Blu-ray, DVD, and Ultra HD Blu-ray on April 5 by 20th Century Studios Home Entertainment.

Reception

Streaming viewership 
According to the streaming aggregator Reelgood, Death on the Nile was the most watched film across all platforms, during the week of April 6, 2022. According to Whip Media, Death on the Nile was the most watched movie across all platforms, in the United States, during the week of April 8, 2022, to April 10, 2022.

Box office

Death on the Nile grossed $45.6million in the United States and Canada, and $91.6million in other territories, for a worldwide total of $137.3million.

In the United States and Canada, Death on the Nile was released alongside Marry Me and Blacklight, and was projected to gross $11–17 million from 3,280 theaters in its opening weekend. The film grossed $12.9 million in its opening weekend, finishing first at the box office. Overall audiences during its opening were 51% male, 77% above the age of 25, 47% above 35, and 28% above 45. The ethnic breakdown of the audience showed that 57% were Caucasian, 15% Hispanic and Latino Americans, 13% African American, and 15% Asian or other. The film made $6.6 million in its second weekend, and $4.5 million in its third, placing fourth both times. The film earned $2.75 million in its fourth weekend, $2.4 million in its fifth, and $1.65 million in its sixth. The film dropped out of the box office top ten in its seventh weekend, finishing eleventh with $630,520.

Outside the U.S. and Canada, the film grossed $20.7 million in its opening weekend from 47 international markets. The film opened in China on February 19, 2022. It opened poorly in the country, finishing fourth behind three Chinese holdovers with $5.9 million. Including its Chinese debut, the film earned $19.8 million in its second international weekend. It made an additional $10.6 million from 47 markets in its third weekend, crossing the $100 million mark worldwide, $5.1 million in its fourth, $3 million in its fifth, and $1.6 million in its sixth.

Critical response
  Audiences polled by CinemaScore gave the film an average grade of "B" on an A+ to F scale, the same as its predecessor, while those at PostTrak gave it a 77% positive score, with 57% saying they would definitely recommend it.

David Rooney of The Hollywood Reporter wrote: "For some of us who look back with affection on John Guillermin's lush 1978 screen version, there's a nagging feeling throughout that Branagh, while hitting the marks of storytelling and design, has drained some of the fun out of it." Owen Gleiberman of Variety called the film "a moderately diverting dessert that carries you right along. It never transcends the feeling that you're seeing a relic injected with life serum, but that, in a way, is part of its minor-league charm." Edward Porter of The Times gave the film three out of five stars, saying that its "gaudy style — combined with the melodrama of the script's modified take on Christie's plot — remains diverting even if some of the supposedly Egyptian backdrops look phoney." Sandra Hall of The Sydney Morning Herald gave the film four out of five stars, writing: "While the gamble Branagh takes in disinterring Poirot's long-neglected sensitive side may be regarded as sacrilege by some, I think it works. Poirot has a yearning heart." Byron Lafayette in his review column Under The Lens gave the film four and a half out of five stars, writing "Death on the Nile is a magnificent costume drama, the picture delivers on the promise of a great whodunit, while also letting us get to know the various characters who populate this story, by the time the credits rolled I was thoroughly invested in these people" 

Wendy Ide of The Observer gave the film two out of five stars, writing: "The camera whirls giddily, dizzy from the sparkle and spectacle, but not quite able to conceal the fact that this is an empty bauble of a movie." David Fear of Rolling Stone wrote that the film "has its joys and flaws apart from that Armie factor, but it's almost like trying to assess whether the appetizer course could have been slightly undercooked while an elephant stampedes over the whole dinner table." Joe Morgenstern of The Wall Street Journal wrote that the film "has pizazz and period style in the same way today's big-brand toothpastes have flavor – artificial ingredients give them a taste that's discernible, but too generic to name."

Accolades
The film was nominated for Best Action / Adventure Film at the 47th Saturn Awards but lost to Top Gun: Maverick. It also received a nomination for Outstanding Supporting Visual Effects in a Photoreal Feature at the 21st Visual Effects Society Awards.

Sequel

In a December 2017 interview with the Associated Press, Branagh discussed developing the adaptation of Death on the Nile with the possibility of more films to follow, potentially creating a new "cinematic universe" of Christie films:

In February 2022, Branagh stated that discussions for additional films were ongoing. The filmmaker and star stated that he hopes the film series becomes a franchise of various films including various other characters created by Agatha Christie, including Jane Marple. By March of the same year, 20th Century Studios President Steve Asbell confirmed that a third movie was in development. Branagh will return as director and star, while Michael Green will once again serve as screenwriter. The third film will take place in "post-war Venice"; an adaptation "of one of the lesser-known novels". The third film was confirmed on October 10, 2022 as an adaptation of Hallowe'en Party entitled A Haunting in Venice. Brannagh will once again direct and star as Poirot. The film will also star Tina Fey, Jamie Dornan, Michelle Yeoh, Kyle Allen, Camille Cottin, and Jude Hill, among others. The film was set to begin production in November 2022, for a release in 2023.

References

External links
 
 
 
 

20th Century Studios films
2022 crime thriller films
2020s English-language films
2020s mystery thriller films
American crime thriller films
American detective films
American mystery thriller films
American sequel films
Casting controversies in film
Film controversies in Tunisia
Films about honeymoon
Films about vacationing
Films based on British novels
Films based on crime novels
Films based on Hercule Poirot books
Films directed by Kenneth Branagh
Films postponed due to the COVID-19 pandemic
Films scored by Patrick Doyle
Films set in 1914
Films set in 1937
Films set in Belgium
Films set in Egypt
Films set in London
Films set on rivers
Films set on cruise ships
Films shot at Longcross Studios
Films shot in Surrey
Films with screenplays by Michael Green (writer)
Murder mystery films
Nile in fiction
River adventure films
Scott Free Productions films
TSG Entertainment films
2020s American films
Abu Simbel